Quỳ Hợp is a rural district of Nghệ An province in the North Central Coast region of Vietnam. As of 2003, the district had a population of 119,960. The district covers an area of 942 km². The district capital lies at Quỳ Hợp.

References

Districts of Nghệ An province